

Highest-grossing films

List of films
A list of films released in Japan in 1996 (see 1996 in film).

See also
1996 in Japan
1996 in Japanese television

References

Bibliography

External links
 Japanese films of 1996 at the Internet Movie Database

1996
Japanese
Films